The discography of The Vaccines, an English indie rock band, currently consists of five studio albums, one live album, sixteen B-sides, and twenty-six singles.

Albums

Studio albums

Compilations 

 The Hits (2021)

Live albums
Live from London, England (2011)

Extended plays
Live from Brighton, England (2012)
Please, Please Do Not Disturb (2012)
NME Presents The Vaccines, Home is Where the Start Is, Home Demos 2009–2012 (2013)
Melody Calling (2013)
Total Power Pop (2018)
Cosy Karaoke Vol.1 (2021)
Planet of the Youth (2022)

Splits
Why Should I Love You? / Post Break Up Sex w/ R Stevie Moore (2012)

Singles

B-sides

Guest appearances

Music videos

Notes

References

Discographies of British artists
Rock music group discographies